Stone Cold Steve Austin (born 1964) is an American actor and retired professional wrestler

Stephen, Steven, or Steve Austin may also refer to:

Stephen F. Austin (1793–1836), the "Father of Texas"
Steve Austin (dog trainer), Australian dog trainer
Steve Austin (character), the title character from Cyborg and The Six Million Dollar Man
Steve Austin (musician) (born 1966), member of the rock band Today is the Day
Steve Austin (band), German hardcore band
Steve Austin (athlete) (born 1951), Australian long distance runner
Steven Kent Austin, American actor, movie producer and movie director
Stephen Austin (American football), former NFL executive

See also
Austin Stevens (born 1950), South African-born Australian naturalist, documentarian and author